Bryan Christopher Augenstein (born July 11, 1986) is an American former professional baseball pitcher who played in Major League Baseball (MLB) for the Arizona Diamondbacks and St. Louis Cardinals.

Early life
Augenstein was born in Sebastian, Florida. He graduated from Sebastian River High School in Sebastian, where he played for the Sebastian River Sharks high school baseball team.

College career
Augenstein accepted an athletic scholarship to attend the University of Florida in Gainesville, Florida, and played for coach Pat McMahon's Florida Gators baseball team from 2005 to 2007.  As a freshman in 2005, he was a member of the Gators team that finished as the runner-up in the College World Series.  Memorably, Augenstein retired twenty-three consecutive batters against the Cincinnati Bearcats in 2006.

He was also a member of the U.S. national baseball team that played in the 2006 World Baseball Classic.  He led the Gators in appearances, innings pitched, strikeouts and wins in both 2006 and 2007, and finished his three-year college career with five complete games and 216 strikeouts.

Professional career
The Arizona Diamondbacks selected Augenstein in the seventh round of the 2007 Major League Baseball Draft. He made his major league debut on May 13, against the Cincinnati Reds.

On October 13, 2010, Augenstein was claimed off waivers by the St. Louis Cardinals. He spent the 2012 season in the Tampa Bay Rays organization. He signed a minor league deal with the Detroit Tigers on March 26, 2014, and he became a free agent after the 2014 season.

See also

 List of Florida Gators baseball players

References

External links

1986 births
Living people
Arizona Diamondbacks players
St. Louis Cardinals players
Florida Gators baseball players
Missoula Osprey players
South Bend Silver Hawks players
Visalia Oaks players
Reno Aces players
Mobile BayBears players
Palm Beach Cardinals players
Memphis Redbirds players
Durham Bulls players
Toledo Mud Hens players
Erie SeaWolves players
Baseball players from Florida
Major League Baseball pitchers
People from Sebastian, Florida